Richland Township is a township in Delaware County, Iowa, USA.  As of the 2000 census, its population was 575.

Geography
Richland Township covers an area of 36.65 square miles (94.93 square kilometers); of this, 0.18 square miles (0.47 square kilometers) or 0.5 percent is water. The streams of Fenchel Creek and Sand Hagen Creek run through this township.

History 
According to the 1870 census, about 883 people lived there. 68 of them were born in Bohemia, several having immigrated from the Tábor District from villages like Hlavatce and Val as well as the town Veselí nad Lužnicí.

Cities and towns
 Dundee

Unincorporated towns
 Forestville
(This list is based on USGS data and may include former settlements.)

Adjacent townships
 Cass Township, Clayton County (north)
 Lodomillo Township, Clayton County (northeast)
 Honey Creek Township (east)
 Delaware Township (southeast)
 Coffins Grove Township (south)
 Fremont Township, Buchanan County (southwest)
 Madison Township, Buchanan County (west)
 Putnam Township, Fayette County (northwest)

Cemeteries
The township contains six cemeteries: Forestville, Pleasant Hill, Reynolds, Saint Albert, Spring Hill and Stanger Farm.

Major highways

References
 U.S. Board on Geographic Names (GNIS)
 United States Census Bureau cartographic boundary files

External links
 US-Counties.com
 City-Data.com

Townships in Delaware County, Iowa
Townships in Iowa